Intel Extreme Masters Season IX – World Championship Katowice, also known as IEM Season IX World Championship took place in 2015. Intel Extreme Masters World Championship was held in Katowice, Silesian Voivodeship, Poland from March 12 to March 15, 2015. The World Championship has sanctioned official events include events of Starcraft II and League of Legends. It was the final event of Intel Extreme Masters Season IX.

World Championship – Katowice

StarCraft II

League of Legends

Results

StarCraft II 

Source: Intel Extreme Masters

League of Legends

References

External links
 

2015 in esports
2015 in Polish sport
Intel Extreme Masters
League of Legends competitions
StarCraft competitions